Jesper de Jong and Tim van Rijthoven were the defending champions but chose not to defend their title.

Nuno Borges and Francisco Cabral won the title after defeating Sanjar Fayziev and Markos Kalovelonis 6–3, 6–0 in the final.

Seeds

Draw

References

External links
 Main draw

Open de Oeiras - Doubles